Button for Sleep is a Bulgarian children's play, written by Valeri Petrov in 1978. It is a musical with music by Georgi Genkov. Several notable productions of the play have been put on in Bulgarian, including at the Youth Theatre "Nikolay Binev" in Sofia under Ivan Urumov, the "Patilan" Municipal Theatre under Anastasia Iankova, and the "Ivan Dimov" Dramatic Theatre in Haskovo and Puppet Theatre in Sliven, staged by Zlati Zlatev.

References

1978 plays
Bulgarian plays